Emerson Francisco Matías (born December 1, 1981 in Brazil), known as Emerson Reba, is a Brazilian footballer currently playing for Defensa y Justicia in the Primera B Nacional Argentina.

Teams
  Independiente F.B.C. 2011
  Defensa y Justicia 2012–present

External links
 
 

1981 births
Living people
Brazilian footballers
Brazilian expatriate footballers
Independiente F.B.C. footballers
Defensa y Justicia footballers
Expatriate footballers in Argentina
Expatriate footballers in Paraguay
Association football forwards